John Wexley (1907 – February 4, 1985) was an American writer, best known for his play The Last Mile.

Early life and career
Wexley was born in New York City. His early career involved acting as part of Eva Le Gallienne's Civic Repertory Theatre.

Theatre
In 1930, Wexley wrote the play The Last Mile, one of the most prominent "prison dramas" of the 1930s. Brooks Atkinson of The New York Times called it "a taut, searing drama" and "an evening of nerve-racking tension in the theatre". A Pacific coast production was produced by Lillian Albertson at the Majestic Theatre in Los Angeles, and it was adapted for the screen in 1932 and 1959. In 1934, he wrote another play titled They Shall Not Die, a dramatization of the Scottsboro case and trials. First performed at the Royale Theatre in March 1934, Brooks Atkinson described it as "a play of terrifying and courageous bluntness of statement". A film adaptation was planned in 1950 by Charles K. Feldman, with Wexley having written the screenplay.

In 1937, his play Steel was performed at the Labor Stage by members of the International Ladies Garment Workers Union. It had a successful run in New York as well as national tours. In 1945, Wexley wrote Tears Without Laughter, which focuses on Nazi plots to establish cartels in the United States. It was "aimed at" husband-wife duo Alfred Lunt and Lynn Fontanne.  In 1946, Wexley's play Carrot and Club was performed by the Theatre Guild.

Film
During the 1930s and 1940s, he wrote several screenplays. These included Angels with Dirty Faces in 1938, the 1939 films Confessions of a Nazi Spy and The Amazing Dr. Clitterhouse, the 1943 film Hangmen Also Die!, and the 1947 film The Long Night. In 1945, he wrote the story for [[Cornered (1945 film)|Cornered]].

In 1943, Wexley wrote an original screenplay for a film titled Malta. It was due to be produced by Joe Pasternak and distributed by Metro-Goldwyn-Mayer. Philip Dorn and Donna Reed were cast to star in the film. In the early 1940s, Wexley had written a screenplay about General Mark W. Clark. The film, titled Advance Agent to Africa, was warned against by the State Department and War Department, apparently due to its accurate descriptions of army tactics. It was cancelled by Paramount Pictures in 1943.

Wexley also worked on the script of Song of Russia for four weeks towards the end of the project.

Other work
In 1955, he published a book about Julius and Ethel Rosenberg titled The Judgment of Julius and Ethel Rosenberg. He continued to write and lecture.

Wexley also served in the military, but was discharged some time prior to December 1945.

Communist links
Wexley was named as a communist sympathiser multiple times throughout the 1950s in front of the House Un-American Activities Committee (HUAC). On April 25, 1951, Edward Dmytryk named him as one of several Hollywood stars who were members of the American Communist Party. In March 1953, film writer David A. Lang testified that Wexley was one of several writers who had attended communist meetings. In May 1953, he was one of 57 alleged communists named by Robert Rossen in front of the HUAC.

Some of his works had previously been accused of being pro-communist: the theatre reviewer of the NAACP's magazine The Crisis referred to his play They Shall Not Die as "propaganda for the Communist party transferred to the stage".

According to Graham Petrie, Wexley was a confirmed member of the American Communist Party.

Personal life
After retiring, Wexley moved to Doylestown, Pennsylvania. He was married to a woman named Katherine and had at least one child, a daughter named Thea.

Wexley died of a heart attack on February 4, 1985, at the age of 77.

Published works

Plays
The Last Mile (1930)
They Shall Not Die (1934)
Steel
Tears Without Laughter (1945)
Carrot and Club

Books
The Judgment of Julius and Ethel Rosenberg (1955)

Filmography

References

External links
 
 

1907 births
1985 deaths
20th-century American dramatists and playwrights
20th-century American screenwriters
Writers from New York City